Girella leonina is a species of sea chubs in the family Kyphosidae, native to the Western Central Pacific in areas from Hong Kong to Japan, in waters 1 to 15 meters (3-49 ft) deep, in shallow rocky reefs.

Description and feeding 
Girella leonina grows up to 46 centimeters in length with a blackish coloring. Its diet is made up of plants and prymnesiophyceae.

References 

Fish described in 1846
leonina
Fish of Japan
Fish of the Pacific Ocean